Alison Brie Schermerhorn (born December 29, 1982) is an American actress. Her breakthrough came with the role of Trudy Campbell in the drama series Mad Men (2007–2015), which won her a Screen Actors Guild Award. She gained recognition for her role as Annie Edison in the NBC sitcom Community (2009–2015) and voicing Diane Nguyen in the animated comedy series BoJack Horseman (2014–2020). For playing Ruth Wilder in the comedy-drama series GLOW (2017–2019), she received nominations for two Golden Globes and two Critics' Choice Awards.

In addition to her television work, Brie has also starred in films such as Scream 4 (2011), The Five-Year Engagement (2012), The Lego Movie (2014), Get Hard (2015), Sleeping with Other People (2015), How to Be Single (2016), The Little Hours (2017), The Disaster Artist (2017), The Post (2017), Promising Young Woman (2020), Horse Girl (2020), The Rental (2020), and Happiest Season (2020).

Early life
Alison Brie Schermerhorn was born on December 29, 1982, in Hollywood, California. Her father, Charles Terry Schermerhorn, is a musician and freelance entertainment reporter. Her mother, Joanne Brenner, works at Para los Niños ("For the Children"), a non-profit childcare agency. She has an older sister named Lauren. Brie's mother is Jewish. Her father was raised Catholic, and has Dutch, English, and Scottish ancestry. While being raised by her divorced parents, she occasionally attended a "Christian–Hindu hybrid church" called the Self-Realization Fellowship with her father. Brie graduated from South Pasadena High School in 2001. The summer between high school and college, she worked as a clown at children's birthday parties.

Brie graduated from the California Institute of the Arts with a bachelor's degree in theater in 2005. Her studies included a year at the Royal Scottish Academy of Music and Drama in Glasgow.

Career
Brie began acting onstage at the Jewish Community Center in Southern California. Her first television role came in 2006, as Nina, a novice hairdresser, on the Disney Channel sitcom Hannah Montana. She received further recognition as Trudy Campbell in the AMC period drama series Mad Men (2007–2015), which won her the Screen Actors Guild Award for Outstanding Performance by an Ensemble in a Drama Series. She went on to star in the web series My Alibi, which aired from 2008 to 2009.

From 2009 to 2015, Brie portrayed Annie Edison on the NBC/Yahoo! View sitcom Community, for which she earned acclaim. She was nominated for the Critics' Choice Television Award for Best Supporting Actress in a Comedy Series and won an Entertainment Weekly Award from two nominations. In April 2010, Brie co-hosted an episode of Attack of the Show! (and again in March 2011) and appeared in a segment on Web Soup. She appeared in the 2010 comedy film Montana Amazon. Brie made Maxim magazine's 2010 Hot 100 list at number 99 and appeared at number 49 in their 2011 list. She was voted the 57th Sexiest Woman in the World by FHM readers in 2013. She was voted the 2nd most desirable woman in the world by AskMen readers in 2014.

Brie starred in several major film roles, including as Rebecca Walters, Sidney Prescott's assistant, in the slasher horror film Scream 4 (2011), and Suzie Barnes in the romantic comedy film The Five-Year Engagement (2012). She voiced Princess Unikitty in the animated comedy film The Lego Movie (2014), and voiced a character in an episode of the animated series American Dad!, which aired during their eighth season.

In June 2014, Brie joined the cast of the Netflix series BoJack Horseman, which debuted on August 22. She has since voiced a variety of characters, including main character Diane Nguyen and recurring character Vincent Adultman. Brie appeared on Lip Sync Battle and won against Will Arnett with performances of "Shoop" by Salt-N-Pepa and "Bang Bang" by Jessie J, Ariana Grande, and Nicki Minaj.

In 2015, she starred with Jason Sudeikis in Leslye Headland's romantic comedy film Sleeping with Other People, and played Will Ferrell's character's fiancée in the comedy film Get Hard. In 2016, Brie starred as Lucy in the romantic comedy film How to Be Single and portrayed Martha Dunstable in Julian Fellowes' adaptation of Anthony Trollope's Dr. Thorne for television.

In 2017, she co-starred in several films, including the historical comedy The Little Hours, the biographical comedy-drama The Disaster Artist, and the historical drama The Post. From 2017 to 2019, Brie starred as Ruth Wilder in the Netflix comedy-drama series GLOW, which was inspired by the 1980s female professional wrestling promotion Gorgeous Ladies of Wrestling. Brie noted that since appearing in GLOW and receiving critical praise for the role, she has become more focused on taking meaningful roles. For her performance, she earned multiple nominations for the Critics' Choice Television Award for Best Actress in a Comedy Series, the Screen Actors Guild Award for Outstanding Performance by a Female Actor in a Comedy Series, and the Golden Globe Award for Best Actress – Television Series Musical or Comedy.

In 2018, she co-starred in the music video for Beck's "Colors". In 2019, she reprised her voice role as Princess Unikitty in the animated comedy sequel film The Lego Movie 2: The Second Part and provided an English dub for the Japanese animated romantic fantasy film Weathering with You.

In 2020, Brie starred in the acclaimed drama thriller film Promising Young Woman, directed by Emerald Fennell. Also that year, she wrote, produced and starred as Sarah in the Netflix drama film Horse Girl, which was directed by Jeff Baena. Brie then starred opposite Dan Stevens in the horror film The Rental, which was directed by her husband Dave Franco. Brie played Sloane in the romantic comedy film Happiest Season, directed by Clea DuVall. In 2021, she starred as a celebrity guest voice in the fifth season of the animated sitcom Rick and Morty.

In 2022, Alison Brie starred in and co-wrote the dark comedy film Spin Me Round along with frequent collaborator and director Jeff Baena. The film released in select theatres by IFC Films and on AMC+ for streaming. In 2022, Alison Brie also starred in an episode of the Apple TV+ anthology tv series ROAR titled "The Woman Who Solved Her Own Murder". The series is based on the eponymous book by Cecelia Ahern.
 
In 2022, it was also announced Brie would be reprising her role as Annie in a Community movie.

In 2023, Brie wrote and starred in the romantic comedy film Somebody I Used to Know with her husband Dave Franco who also co-wrote and directed the film. It released on Amazon Prime Video on February 10th and became the number one movie on the platform both in the USA and worldwide. In 2023, Alison Brie also voiced the character of Aftershock in the Disney cartoon show Marvel's Moon Girl and Devil Dinosaur.

In February 2023, it was revealed that Alison Brie had been cast in Peacock's limited tv series adaptation of the Liane Moriarty novel Apples Never Fall'' alongside Jake Lacy, Annette Bening. and Sam Neill.

Personal life
Brie began dating Dave Franco in 2012 after meeting him at a 2011 Mardi Gras party in New Orleans. On August 25, 2015, it was reported the two were engaged. They married on March 13, 2017. In an interview with Larry King in 2017, she said that she did not want to have children.

Filmography

Film

Television

Web

Video games

Music videos

Theme park attractions

Awards and nominations

References

External links

 
 

1982 births
Living people
Schermerhorn family
American film actresses
American voice actresses
Jewish American actresses
American television actresses
American video game actresses
21st-century American actresses
Actresses from Hollywood, Los Angeles
Actresses from Pasadena, California
Alumni of the Royal Conservatoire of Scotland
American people of Dutch descent
American people of Latvian descent
American people of Latvian-Jewish descent
American people of English descent
American people of Scottish descent
California Institute of the Arts alumni
Childfree
21st-century American Jews